Benjamin Sherman (1792 – 1872) was an American politician who served one term in the Michigan House of Representatives in its first session after adoption of the state constitution.

Biography 

Benjamin Sherman was born in Connecticut in 1792. He settled in Genesee County, New York, and was a contractor on the Erie Canal project. He moved to Nottawa, Michigan, in 1825.

He was elected as a Democrat to the Michigan House of Representatives in the first election under the state's constitution in 1835, and served through 1836. He was the St. Joseph County coroner from 1833 to 1837, a county supervisor in 1832, a justice of the peace from 1836 to 1846, and a lieutenant colonel in the state militia in 1835. He also served as the register of the United States land office at Ionia, Michigan, under Presidents Martin Van Buren and Franklin Pierce. Sherman Township was named after him in 1829, and he began running a tavern there in 1831.

Sherman died in 1872.

Notes

References 
 
 
 

1792 births
1872 deaths
Democratic Party members of the Michigan House of Representatives
19th-century American politicians